The Cottage Grove Sentinel is a weekly newspaper serving the city of Cottage Grove, Oregon, United States. It was established in 1889 and is owned by News Media Corporation. News Media bought the Sentinel from Lee Enterprises in 2006. Lee had owned the paper since 1997. The Sentinel is published on Fridays and has a circulation of 3,331.

Early history 
The earliest newspaper in Cottage Grove was the Cottage Grove Leader (1889–1895), which was first published in Drain, Oregon using a military style press by E.P. Thorp. After several editions, operations moved to Cottage Grove, Oregon where the masthead and logo was rebranded the "Cottage Grove Echo=Leader" as it continued to provide news for the growing village.

On November 30, 1895, during the height of a town feud, when the western side of town briefly changed their name to Lemati, the newspaper adopted both of the names Cottage Grove and Lemati Echo Leader for a single run. Only one edition was printed after a two-and-a-half-month absence from the publication of the Echo=Leader. When publication resumed, the Cottage Grove and Lemati Echo=Leader shortened its name, and was stylized only as The Leader. It ran under this name from 1895 through 1915.

While the city was still divided, another competitive newspaper published by Horace Mann came to town called the Cottage Grove Messenger. He sold the publication that year to C.J. Howard, who was a Dorena, Oregon resident and postmaster. Under Howard's ownership, the Cottage Grove Messenger was renamed the Bohemia Nugget.

Mining camps at one point outnumbered the population of Cottage Grove, and a newly christened Bohemia Nugget, which ran from 1899–1907 helped them stay in touch with news, politics, and events.

Behind the scenes, it was scarcely known that both of the newspapers were secretly financed and managed by a single miner, promoter, and publisher, F. J. Hard, who began operating the weekly publications for the miners and families out at the Bohemia Mountain camps and the residents of Cottage Grove.

The Western Oregon lasted from 1905–1909, until Lew A. Cates, a "live wire" publisher out of the Midwest, traveled to Oregon seeking to purchase either the Tillamook Headlight on the coast or the Western Oregon in the valley. Cates took a chance with Cottage Grove in the Willamette valley and with the Western Oregon newspaper, Cates purchased it and rebranded it, The Cottage Grove Sentinel. The old Leader newspaper continued as well, until it was eventually absorbed by The Sentinel in 1915.

The Cottage Grove Sentinel was established in September 1909 and has been in continuous operation since, serving Cottage Grove, Creswell, Pleasant Hill, Saginaw, Drain, Lorane, Yoncalla, and Elkton.

See also 
Daniel Gault

References

External links 
Cottage Grove Sentinel (official website)

1889 establishments in Oregon
Cottage Grove, Oregon
Newspapers published in Oregon
Oregon Newspaper Publishers Association
Publications established in 1889
Weekly newspapers published in the United States